The Taming of the Shrew is a 1967 period romantic comedy film directed by Franco Zeffirelli, based on William Shakespeare’s play about a courtship between two strong-willed people in 16th-century Italy. The film stars Elizabeth Taylor (who also produced) as Kate and Richard Burton as Petruchio, who were both nominated for BAFTA Awards for their acting. It features Cyril Cusack, Michael Hordern, Michael York, and Victor Spinetti in supporting roles.

The Taming of the Shrew premiered with a Royal Film Performance on 27 February 1967. At the 40th Academy Awards,  it was nominated for Best Costume Design and Best Art Direction - Set Decoration. Burton was nominated for the Golden Globe Award for Best Actor – Comedy or Musical, and the film was nominated for Best Motion Picture – Comedy or Musical. Burton and Taylor also received BAFTA nominations.

This was one of three Shakespearen film adaptations directed by Zeffirelli, followed by Romeo and Juliet in 1968, and Hamlet in 1990.

Plot 

Baptista Minola is attempting to marry off his two daughters; however, he will marry off his youngest, Bianca only if someone will marry his eldest, Katherina. Katherina is an ill-tempered shrewish woman but a lusty young nobleman, Petruchio, takes on the challenge of taming and marrying her. A subplot involves the wooing of Bianca by several suitors including handsome Lucentio, foppish Hortensio, and elderly Gremio.

Cast

Production
The film was originally intended to be a vehicle for Sophia Loren and Marcello Mastroianni. Taylor and Burton put over a million dollars into the production and, instead of a salary, took a percentage of profits. It was shot entirely at Dino De Laurentiis’ studios in Rome.

Unlike her husband, Taylor had never performed Shakespeare before, and she was said to be very nervous prior to the beginning of the shoot. As she found her way into the role, and became more confident, she asked Franco Zeffirelli if she could shoot everything from the first day of shooting again, as she didn't think her performance was up to scratch. Zefferilli assured her it was, but she was persistent, and on the last day of principal photography, the entire first day was shot again.

Release 
The film's premiere was the Royal Film Performance at the Odeon Leicester Square in London on February 27, 1967, attended by Princess Margaret, Countess of Snowdon. It had its US premiere at the Coronet Theatre in New York City on March 8, 1967, starting its regular run the following day.

Reception

Box office
The Taming of the Shrew grossed $8 million in North America, earning $3,540,000 in theatrical rentals during 1967, making it the 25th highest grossing picture of 1967. The film grossed $12 million worldwide.

Critical reception
The film received positive reviews from modern critics. Review aggregator Rotten Tomatoes reports that 83% of professional critics gave the film a positive review, based on 23 reviews with an average rating of 7.5/10. The website's critical consensus states: "It may not be reverent enough for purists, but this Taming of the Shrew is too funny – and fun – for the rest of us to resist."

Awards and nominations

Comparison to source material 
The film screenplay cuts most of the subplot of Lucentio and Bianca, and the entire Christopher Sly framing device. Other scenes are trimmed of dialogue, or have lines moved from one to another. The film also adds additional scenes, with little or no dialogue, focusing on Kate and Petruchio.

Taylor plays Kate’s final, controversial speech without any obvious irony (such as Mary Pickford’s wink in the 1929 film); however, her taming is apparently undercut by her quick exit from the banquet, which forces Burton’s Petruchio to chase after her amid jeers from the other men. According to Harold Bloom's take on the play, Katherina is “advising women how to rule absolutely, while feigning obedience”.

See also
List of American films of 1967

Notes

References

External links
 
 
 
 
 
 eNotes Article
 Phoenix Cinema Article

1967 films
1967 romantic comedy films
1967 directorial debut films
American romantic comedy films
American historical comedy films
Italian romantic comedy films
Italian historical comedy films
Columbia Pictures films
Romantic period films
Films scored by Nino Rota
Films directed by Franco Zeffirelli
Films based on The Taming of the Shrew
Films set in the 16th century
Films set in Italy
Films with screenplays by Suso Cecchi d'Amico
Films with screenplays by Paul Dehn
British romantic comedy films
British historical comedy films
Films shot in Rome
1960s English-language films
1960s American films
1960s British films
1960s Italian films